Bret Samuel Weinstein (born February 21, 1969) is an American podcaster, author, and former professor of evolutionary biology. He served on the faculty of Evergreen State College from 2002 until 2017, when he resigned in the aftermath of a series of campus protests about racial equity at Evergreen, which brought Weinstein to national attention. Along with his brother Eric Weinstein, he is considered part of the intellectual dark web. Weinstein has been criticized for making false statements about COVID-19 treatments and vaccines.

Education
Weinstein, a native of Southern California, began his undergraduate studies at the University of Pennsylvania. As a freshman, he wrote a letter to the school newspaper that condemned sexual harassment of strippers at a Zeta Beta Tau fraternity party. After experiencing harassment for the letter, he transferred to the University of California, Santa Cruz, where he met his wife, Heather Heying, and completed an undergraduate degree in biology in 1993. Weinstein went on to earn a PhD in evolutionary biology from the University of Michigan in 2009.

Career

Evergreen State College 
Until 2017, Weinstein was a professor of biology at Evergreen State College in Washington State. In 2002, he coauthored an article on "The Reserve-Capacity Hypothesis", which proposed that the telomeric differences between humans and laboratory mice have led scientists to underestimate the risks that new drugs pose to humans in the form of heart disease, liver dysfunction, and related organ failure.

Evergreen State College Day of Absence
In March 2017, Weinstein wrote a letter to Evergreen faculty in which he objected to a suggestion pertaining to the college's decades-old tradition of observing a "Day of Absence", during which ethnic minority students and faculty would voluntarily stay away from campus to highlight their contributions to the college. An administrator had suggested that for that year white participants stay off campus, and were invited to attend an off-campus program on race issues. Weinstein wrote that the change established a dangerous precedent:

The event organizers responded that participation was voluntary and that the event did not imply that all white people should leave. The Washington Post reported that racial tensions had been simmering at Evergreen throughout 2017.

In May 2017, student protests disrupted the campus and called for a number of changes to the college. The protests involved allegations of racism, intolerance and threats; brought national attention to Evergreen; and sparked further debate about free speech on college campuses. During the protests, protesters entered one of Weinstein's classes (which he had held in a public park) and confronted him, loudly accusing him of racism, demanding that he resign, and forcing the class to break up. Weinstein was advised by the Chief of Campus Police to temporarily stay away from campus for his safety.

Weinstein and his wife, Heather Heying, brought a lawsuit against the school, alleging that the college's president had not asked campus police to quell student protesters. Weinstein also said that campus police had told him that they could not protect him, and that they had encouraged him to stay off campus. Instead, Weinstein held his biology class that day in a public park. A settlement was reached in September 2017 in which Weinstein and Heying resigned and received $250,000 each, after having sought $3.8 million in damages.

Post-Evergreen activities

Following his resignation from Evergreen, he appeared on the podcasts of Sam Harris and Joe Rogan on many occasions. He moderated two debates between Harris and Jordan Peterson. He appeared in the documentary No Safe Spaces, which documents the Evergreen incidents. Weinstein's brother Eric coined the term "intellectual dark web" and described Bret as a member. The term refers to a group of academics and media personalities who publish and debate outside the mainstream media.

In June 2019, Weinstein began the DarkHorse Podcast on his YouTube channel, which is usually co-hosted with his wife Heather. Their first guest was Andy Ngo, and guests have also included Glenn Loury, Douglas Murray, Sam Harris, John Wood Jr., Thomas Chatterton Williams and Coleman Hughes. Topics for the podcast often center on current events, science, and culture.

Weinstein was a 2019–2020 James Madison Program Visiting Fellow at Princeton University, which continued for the 2020–2021 year.

In 2021, Weinstein and Heying's book, A Hunter-Gatherer's Guide to the 21st Century, was published. The book reached the New York Times Best Seller list for October 3, 2021, at No. 3 for Combined Print & E-Book Nonfiction and No. 4 for Hardcover Nonfiction. The hardcover listing was marked with a dagger, indicating that some retailers had reported receiving bulk orders. Reviewing the book for The Guardian, psychologist Stuart J. Ritchie wrote that the authors "lazily repeat false information from other pop-science books", and that overall the book was characterized by an annoying, know-it-all attitude.

Personal life and views
Weinstein is married to Heather Heying, an evolutionary biologist who also worked at Evergreen. Heying resigned from the college along with Weinstein and took a similar position during the Day of Absence controversy.

Weinstein describes himself as politically liberal, progressive, and left-libertarian. He appeared before the U.S. House Oversight Committee on May 22, 2018, to discuss freedom of speech on college campuses. In 2020, he announced Unity 2020, a plan to nominate for the upcoming US presidential elections a pair of suitable candidates, each associated with one of both major political parties, to govern as a team.

Weinstein has lived in Portland, Oregon, since 2018.

COVID-19 

During the COVID-19 pandemic, Weinstein made several public appearances advocating the use of the antiparasitic drug ivermectin to prevent or treat the disease and downplaying the effectiveness of COVID-19 vaccines. David Gorski, in Science-Based Medicine, described Weinstein as a prominent "COVID-19 contrarian and spreader of disinformation", and "one of the foremost purveyors of COVID-19 disinformation", citing his appearances on Joe Rogan and Bill Maher. Sam Harris criticized Weinstein's advocacy, stating that he "consider[s] it dangerous". Eric Topol, professor of molecular medicine, described Weinstein's position on mRNA vaccines as "totally irresponsible. It's reckless. It's sick. It's predatory. It's really sad."

Weinstein has made erroneous claims that ivermectin can prevent or treat COVID-19, calling it "a near-perfect COVID prophylactic". There is no good evidence to support such claims. Weinstein hosted ivermectin advocate Pierre Kory on his DarkHorse podcast to discuss the drug, and promoted ivermectin on other podcast and television news appearances. Weinstein took ivermectin during a livestream video and said both he and his wife had not been vaccinated because of their fears concerning COVID-19 vaccines. YouTube demonetized the couple's channels in response to their claims about ivermectin. Afterward, Weinstein and Heying moved their subsequent broadcasts to the alternative/fringe video sharing platform Odysee. In August 2021, Weinstein said he had misstated that a study had shown a 100% effective ivermectin protocol for the prevention of COVID. Weinstein considers himself a supporter of vaccines in general; he believes mRNA vaccines have promise despite what he claims are "some clear design flaws". Weinstein has falsely claimed that the spike protein produced by or contained within COVID-19 vaccines is "very dangerous" and "cytotoxic". Weinstein has said that ivermectin alone is "good enough to end the pandemic at any point" and claimed that the drug's true effectiveness against COVID-19 was being suppressed  in order to push vaccines for the financial benefit of Big Pharma. He has told Fox News' Tucker Carlson that if ivermectin functioned as he thought it did, then "the debate about the vaccines would be over by definition."

Selected publications

References

External links

 

1969 births
Living people
Academics from Los Angeles
Scientists from Los Angeles
American libertarians
American podcasters
Evolutionary biologists
Jewish American scientists
COVID-19 conspiracy theorists
University of California, Santa Cruz alumni
University of Michigan alumni
University of Pennsylvania alumni
Evergreen State College faculty
20th-century American Jews
21st-century American Jews
21st-century American biologists
American conspiracy theorists